Nybø is a surname. Notable people with the surname include:

Håvard Nybø (born 1983), Norwegian racing cyclist
Iselin Nybø (born 1981), Norwegian politician
Olga Nybø (born 1930), Norwegian politician 
Sverre Bernhard Nybø (1903–1976), Norwegian politician